Parawana is an extinct Arawakan language of Brazil that was spoken on the Wanawaua River (now known as the Anauá River), a tributary of the lower Rio Branco. A word list was collected by Johann Natterer in 1832.

Parawana and Aroaqui are closely related, and may be the same language.

References

Arawakan languages
Languages of Brazil